Adarsha Andulia is a village in Harinakunda Upazila of Jhenaidah District. A khal (canal) flows through the village. The western part of the village consists of green paddy fields. There is a primary school and a high school. There is a mosque where people pray five times a day. On every Friday, they gather in the mosque for the 'Jumma Prayer' (weekly gathering of the Muslims).

References

Populated places in Khulna Division
Villages in Khulna Division
Villages in Jhenaidah District